Sphodromantis pachinota is a species of praying mantis found in Ethiopia and Sudan.

See also
African mantis
List of mantis genera and species

References

P
Mantodea of Africa
Insects of Ethiopia
Insects of Sudan
Insects described in 1987